The Green Left (ZB), was a green eco-socialist political party in Hungary, founded in 2009.

History
It was established by the merger of the Alliance of Green Democrats (ZDSZ), the European Feminist Initiative for a Different Europe (EFKEME) and the Workers' Party of Hungary 2006. It has a green socialist, radical left, anti-capitalist and alter-globalist ideology. In March 2009, the Hungarian Anti-Fascist League and the Social Charta 2008 joined the alliance. The first leader of the party was György Droppa. On 30 May 2010, Marxist philosopher Gáspár Miklós Tamás was elected new president of the party.

The ZB received only 0.03 percent of the individual votes in the 2010 parliamentary election, while its green party rival the Politics Can Be Different (LMP) jumped over the electoral threshold. After that ZB marginalized, its member parties started to operate independently again. During the 2014 local elections, some members run as candidate under 4K! – Fourth Republic! banner. On 7 September 2015, ZB withdrew its European Green Party membership because of financial reasons.

Election results

National Assembly

References

Sources

External links
Zöldpártok Magyarországon - Örök ígéretek
Facebook page

2009 establishments in Hungary
2018 disestablishments in Hungary
Ecosocialist parties
Feminist parties in Europe
Defunct green political parties
Defunct political parties in Hungary
Defunct socialist parties in Europe
Green political parties in Hungary
Opposition to Viktor Orbán
Political parties disestablished in 2018
Political parties established in 2009
Socialist parties in Hungary
Left-wing politics in Hungary
Left-wing parties